Aja Jerman Bukavec (born 20 August 1999) is a Slovenian rhythmic gymnast.

Career

Junior 
In the 2014 season, she competed at the World Cup Pesaro and World Cup Lisbon. At the International Tournament in Ljubljana, she won Hoop Final and helped her teammates winning a team gold medal. At the Slovenian National Championships she won All-Around gold medal and made it to the junior team, which competed at the 2014 European Championships in Baku, Azerbaijan.

Senior 
She started competing as a senior at the 2015 International Tournament in Moscow, Russia, where she ended in 15th place All-Around. At the 2015 Slovenian National Championships she won a bronze medal in All-Around competition and qualified to the team for 2015 European Championships in Minsk, Belarus. She competed there only with ribbon, but helped the Slovenian team to 19th place.  

In the 2016 season, she competed at the Grand Prix Moscow, Russia and placed 43rd All-Around. At the World Cup Lisbon Aja finished on 8th place All-Around and made it to apparatus finals. She competed at the 2016 Slovenian National Championships and ended on 2nd place All-Around.

Routine music information

External links
https://web.archive.org/web/20160427192420/https://database.fig-gymnastics.com/public/gymnasts/biography/25350/true?backUrl=%2Fpublic%2Fresults%2Fdisplay%2F13400%3FidAgeCategory%3D6%26idCategory%3D76%23anchor_42649
http://klubrg-narodnidom.si/klub/tekmovalke/clanice/161-aja-jerman.html
http://www.mladi-upi.si/clanek/up/aja-jerman-bukavec.html

1999 births
Living people